Danilovgrad is a town in central Montenegro. It has a population of 6,852, according to the 2011 census. It is situated in the Danilovgrad Municipality which lies along the main route between Montenegro's two largest cities, Podgorica and Nikšić. Via villages, Danilovgrad forms part of a conurbation with Podgorica.

The town of Danilovgrad is located in the Bjelopavlići plain, a fertile valley of the Zeta River. It is the centre of the Danilovgrad municipality, which has a population of 18,472.

History
In the surroundings of Danilovgrad, there are remains of Gradina (Martinići), dating back to the time of the Serbian ruler Petar Gojniković, from the Vlastimirović dynasty. The court was built by another member of the dynasty, prince Mutimir, who was also once buried in there. Gradina is also a prominent seat from the Nemanjić period, believed to be the birthplace of Rastko Nemanjić, also known as Saint Sava, the founder of the Serbian Orthodox Church.

Danilovgrad was founded with the purpose of being the capital of Montenegro. Foundations for this planned city were first laid by King Nikola I in 1870. However, after the cities of Nikšić and Podgorica were liberated from Ottoman hands, during the Congress of Berlin, its significance diminished. It was named after Nicholas' predecessor, Prince Danilo.

World War II
On May 31, 1944, a USAF Consolidated B-24 Liberator crashed in Danilovgrad. Although its entire crew of 10 ejected and survived, they were later caught and became prisoners of war. On July 23, 1944, at least 48 members of the League of Communist Youth of Yugoslavia were killed in a mass execution by Chetniks in the village of Lazine.

During the Yugoslav Wars
From 14 to 15 April 1995, a pogrom drove out the Romani population in one of Danilovgrad's neighborhoods, Božova Glavica.

On 24 March 1999, the Milovan Šaranović barracks in Danilovgrad were bombed by NATO aircraft, killing a soldier named Saša Stojić. He was the first victim of the NATO bombing of Yugoslavia.

Climate
Like many parts of Montenegro, Danilovgrad has a humid subtropical climate (Cfa according to the Köppen climate classification) with cool winters and hot, drier summers.

Demographics
According to the 2011 census, the population of the town was 5,156.

Sports
The local football team is FK Iskra, who have been playing in the country's top tier since 2015. They host their games at the Braća Velašević Stadium. The town's basketball team is KK Danilovgrad and RK Danilovgrad is the handball club.

Transport
Danilovgrad is situated approximately halfway between two largest Montenegrin cities, Podgorica and Nikšić, on the main road that connects these two.  It is also served by the Nikšić–Podgorica railway.

International relations

Twin towns – sister cities
Danilovgrad is twinned with:

 Crvenka (Kula), Serbia
 Donetsk, Ukraine
 Grodzisk Mazowiecki, Poland
 Roosendaal, Netherlands
 Serpukhov, Russia

References

External links
 Official site
 Visit-Montenegro.com 

 
Populated places in Danilovgrad Municipality